Lymanbensonia is a genus of epiphytic cacti in the tribe Lymanbensonieae, found in Bolivia, Ecuador, and Peru. The genus was recently reinstated after it was found to be unrelated to Pfeiffera.
 
The genus Lymanbensonia is named after botanist Lyman Benson.

Species
The following species are accepted:

Lymanbensonia brevispina (Barthlott) Barthlott & N.Korotkova
Lymanbensonia choquequiraensis Hoxey
Lymanbensonia crenata (Britton) Doweld
Lymanbensonia incachacana (Cárdenas) Barthlott & N.Korotkova
Lymanbensonia micrantha (Vaupe) Kimnach

References

Cactoideae
Cactoideae genera
Flora of Bolivia
Flora of Ecuador
Flora of Peru